The Ming River, also formerly known as the Qin, Qianbu, and Nanyi River, is a tributary of the Ziya River in Hebei, China.

History
The river gave its name to Imperial China's Ming Prefecture and to its capital Mingzhou, now Guangfu. During the establishment of the Tang, Prince Li Shimin broke a dam across the Ming in order to destroy the rebel army under Liu Heita in AD622.

See also
 Rivers of China

References

Rivers of Hebei